Les Trois-Bassins is a commune in the department of Réunion. It is found on the west coast of the island, and the summit of Grand Bénare lies within its borders. The commune borders Cilaos to the west, Saint-Paul to the north and Saint-Leu to the south. The commune of Trois-Bassins was created on 27 February 1897.

Population

Personalities
Muhammad Ibn 'Abd al-Karim al-Khattabi, the leader of the Rifs, lived here until May 1947.

See also
 Du battant des lames au sommet des montagnes
 Communes of the Réunion department

References

External links
  TCO Site

Communes of Réunion